Donovan is the 14th studio album, and sixteenth album overall, from British singer-songwriter Donovan. It was released in the US (Arista AB 4143) in August 1977 and in the UK (RAK SRAK 528) with a different track order in October 1977.

Background
In 1976, Donovan's record contract with Epic Records came to an end with Slow Down World. The album had only achieved limited chart success, and his contract was not renewed. Donovan's old record producer Mickie Most had launched Rak Records in the UK in 1969 and Donovan and Most teamed up to record Donovan's next album on Rak Records in 1977. Arista Records picked up the distribution rights in the US.

In a distinct change from Slow Down World, the songs on Donovan were an attempt to reach mass audiences again. The songs feature a contemporary sound and, with the exception of "Maya's Dance", generally avoid the gentle balladry of Donovan's previous work. Despite these measures, Donovan failed to chart in both the US and UK, and signalled the end of Donovan's attempts to reach a mainstream audience. He would not release another original album in the United States until 1984.

Reissues
On 27 March 2000, Beat Goes On Records released the US version Donovan (BGOCD375) in the UK on CD. This marked the first time the album was released on CD.

Track listing
All tracks by Donovan Leitch.

Original album

Side one
"Local Boy Chops Wood" – 3:02
"Astral Angel" – 4:32
"The Light" – 4:09
"Dare to Be Different" – 3:50
"Brave New World" – 4:48

Side two
"Lady of the Stars" – 3:02
"International Man" – 3:59
"Sing My Song" – 3:05
"Maya's Dance" – 3:38
"Kalifornia Kiddies" – 3:46

UK version

Side one
"Brave New World" – 4:58
"Astral Angel" – 4:32
"Local Boy Chops Wood" – 3:02
"Kalifornia Kiddies" – 3:46
"The International Man" – 3:59

Side two
"The Light" – 4:09
"Sing My Song" – 3:05
"Lady of the Stars" – 3:02
"Maya's Dance" – 3:38
"Dare to Be Different" – 3:50

Personnel 
Colin Allen – drums
Chris Blair – mastering
John Cameron – horn arrangements, string arrangements
Donovan – guitar, harmonica, vocals
Isaac Guillory – guitar
Patrick Halling – violin
Doug Hopkins – engineer
Ronnie Leahy – keyboards
Gered Mankowitz – photography
Chris Norman – background vocals 
Alan Silson – background vocals 
Nick South – bass
Tim Summerhayes – engineer
Wolfgang Thierbach – engineer
Terry Uttley – background vocals 
Charlie Watts – mastering

External links
 Allmusic review   [ link]
 Donovan (album) – Donovan Unofficial Site

Donovan albums
1977 albums
Albums produced by Mickie Most
Albums arranged by John Cameron (musician)
Rak Records albums